Emile Anner (born 18 January 1940) is a Swiss boxer. He competed in the men's bantamweight event at the 1960 Summer Olympics.

References

External links
 

1940 births
Living people
Bantamweight boxers
Swiss male boxers
Olympic boxers of Switzerland
Boxers at the 1960 Summer Olympics
Sportspeople from Basel-Stadt
20th-century Swiss people